HMS H34 was a British H class submarine built by Cammell Laird, Birkenhead. The vessel was laid down on 20 November 1917 and was commissioned on 10 September 1919. She had a complement of twenty-two crew members.

HMS H34 was one of the seven H class submarines to survive until the end of World War II. During Warship Week 1942 H34 was adopted by West Dean RDC (Gloucestershire).  She was sold for scrapping in Troon in July 1945.

Design

H34 was fitted with an anti-aircraft gun and four  torpedo tubes. Its torpedo tubes were fitted to the bows and the submarine was loaded with eight  torpedoes. She was a Holland 602 type submarine but was designed to meet Royal Navy specifications. The complement was twenty-two crew members.

See also
 List of submarines of the Second World War

References

Bibliography
 

 

British H-class submarines
Ships built on the River Mersey
1918 ships
World War I submarines of the United Kingdom
World War II submarines of the United Kingdom
Royal Navy ship names